Myachkovo is a rural locality (a selo) in Andreyevskoye Rural Settlement, Alexandrovsky District, Vladimir Oblast, Russia. The population was 58 as of 2010.

Geography 
Myachkovo is located 29 km east of Alexandrov (the district's administrative centre) by road. Bunkovo is the nearest rural locality.

References 

Rural localities in Alexandrovsky District, Vladimir Oblast
Alexandrovsky Uyezd (Vladimir Governorate)